Minister of Youth Affairs and Sports may refer to;

 Minister of Youth Affairs and Sports (France)
 Minister of Youth Affairs and Sports (India)
 Minister of Youth Affairs and Sports (Sri Lanka)